Roger Graeme Watson (born 14 January 1964) is an English former cricketer active from 1980 to 1985 who played for Lancashire. He was born in Rawtenstall, Lancashire. He appeared in two first-class matches as a lefthanded batsman and scored 33 runs with a highest score of 18.

Notes

1964 births
People from Rawtenstall
English cricketers
Lancashire cricketers
Living people